Turan Kışlakçı (born 1973) is a Turkish journalist.

Education 
He received his primary and secondary education in schools in the city as he studied for a year in Malatya college of economy before moving to Pakistan where he graduated from fundamentals of religion class at the International Islamic University, Islamabad.

TRT Al Arabiya 
Kachlakji was appointed director of the channel in March 2015.

Awards  
Kashlakji was awarded many times from many official areas in several topics  such as the badge of honor he got from the Syrian Opposition Coalition in 2012 for his support to the Arab Spring.

References

1973 births
Living people
Turkish journalists